Fedorivka is a selo in Novoukrainka Raion, Kirovohrad Oblast of Ukraine. Fedorivka belongs to Tyshkivka rural hromada, one of the hromadas of Ukraine. The village is best known as the site of an ancient mega-settlement dating to 4100 BC belonging to the Cucuteni–Trypillia culture.

This proto-city is just one of 2,440 Cucuteni-Trypillia settlements discovered so far in Moldova and Ukraine. Some 194 (8%) of these settlements had an area of more than 10 hectares between 5000–2700 BC and more than 29 settlements had an area in the range of 100 to 450 hectares.

Until 18 July 2020, Fedorivka belonged to Dobrovelychkivka Raion. The raion was abolished in July 2020 as part of the administrative reform of Ukraine, which reduced the number of raions of Kirovohrad Oblast to four. The area of Dobrovelychkivka Raion was merged into Novoukrainka Raion.

References

Cucuteni–Trypillia culture
Villages in Novoukrainka Raion